Miles E. White (July 27, 1914 – February 17, 2000) was a top costume designer of Broadway musicals for 25 years. He is known in the entertainment industry for his well rendered, prolific, imaginative and witty designs. He won recognition, including four Donaldson Awards and two Tony Awards.

Career
White designed for five movies, and he received Oscar nominations for three of them. These were The Greatest Show on Earth, There's No Business Like Show Business, and Mike Todd's Around the World in 80 Days.
 
White designed costumes for Rodgers and Hammerstein's first two Broadway hits, Oklahoma! and Carousel, and dozens of other musicals as well as ballets, ice shows, circuses, and TV productions. His costume designs for the Ice Capades of 1965 (along with Billy Livingston and Celine Faur) were noted: "And those beautiful costumes are the efforts of Miles White, Billy Livingston and Celine Faur." His last Broadway show was Tricks, in 1973, for which he received a Tony nomination. As musicals were revived, the productions occasionally used his designs, and also true for Fall River Legend for the American Ballet Theater. In 1989, he redesigned the "High Button Shoes" number for Jerome Robbins' Broadway.

Costume designer William Ivey Long referred to Miles White as "his hero," in a recording made of the March 20, 2000, memorial service at the York Theater. In this audio recording, he also cited White's "exquisite drawings," works of art in themselves, in addition to their role as working design sketches.

Douglas Colby, expert on theater design, tells the story of accompanying White to a performance of Fall River Legend several years ago. He said, "The distinguished costume designer Patricia Zipprodt approached the urbane, monocled gentleman I was accompanying, my friend Miles White, and introduced him to her guests as 'God.' One understood what she meant," Colby concluded. This information appears in the Playbill booklet distributed at the March 20, 2000 Memorial Service.

As reported in The New York Times, Mary C. Henderson in her book Theater in America, mentioned that Miles White's designs were inspired by the dance and the circus. "His costumes are constructed to move with the performer's body, not an easy feat," she wrote. After Oklahoma!, she noted, he dominated musical comedy costuming for more than 25 years."

White died on February 17, 2000.

Work
Source for Broadway productions:Playbill Vault

 1938: Paradise Clue
 1938: Right This Way (Broadway Debut)
 1938: You Never Know
 1939: Copacabana
 1939: Walton Roof (Philadelphia)
 1939: Versailles Supper Club
 1940: It Happened On Ice
 1941: Best Foot Forward
 1941: Ringling Bros. and Barnum & Bailey Circus
 1942: The Pirate
 1942: Ringling Bros. and Barnum & Bailey Circus
 1943: Ziegfeld Follies
 1943: Early To Bed
 1943: Get Away Old Man
 1943: Oklahoma!
 1944: Up In Arms (film)
 1944: Dream with Music
 1944: Billy Rose's Diamond Horseshoe
 1944: Bloomer Girl
 1945: Carousel
 1945: The Day Before Spring
 1946: Gypsy Lady
 1946: The Duchess of Malfi
 1946: The Kid From Brooklyn (film)
 1947: Ringling Bros. and Barnum & Bailey Circus
 1947: High Button Shoes (original designs)
 1947: Bloomer Girl (original designs)
 1948: Fall River Legend
 1948: Ringling Bros. and Barnum & Bailey Circus
 1949: Carousel (original designs)
 1949: Gentlemen Prefer Blondes
 1949: Ringling Bros. and Barnum & Bailey Circus
 1950: Bless You All (Tony Award)
 1951: Ringling Bros. and Barnum & Bailey Circus
 1951: Oklahoma! (original designs)
 1951: Ringling Bros. and Barnum & Bailey Circus
 1952: The Greatest Show on Earth (film)
 1952: Ringling Bros. and Barnum & Bailey Circus
 1952: Pal Joey

 1952: Three Wishes For Jamie
 1952: Two's Company
 1953: Oklahoma! (original designs)
 1953: Hazel Flagg (Tony Award)
 1953: Ringling Bros. and Barnum & Bailey Circus
 1954: The Girl in Pink Tights
 1954: There's No Business Like Show Business (film)
 1954: Ringling Bros. and Barnum & Bailey Circus
 1955: Ankles Aweigh
 1955: Ringling Bros. and Barnum & Bailey Circus
 1955: Strip For Action (Closed prior to NY)
 1956: Around the World in Eighty Days
 1957: Eugenia
 1957: Ringling Bros. and Barnum & Bailey Circus
 1957: Time Remembered
 1957: Jamaica
 1957: The Carefree Heart
 1958: Tristan
 1958: Oh, Captain!
 1959: Cheri
 1959: Take Me Along
 1959: Show Business (Carol Channing on tour)
 1960: Bye Bye Birdie
 1960: The Unsinkable Molly Brown
 1961: Show Girl
 1961: Milk And Honey
 1962: Song of Norway (on tour)
 1963: Zenda
 1966: Ice Capades
 1969: 1491
 1969: Oklahoma! (original designs)
 1970: Candida
 1971: A Day In The Life Of Just About Everyone 
 1972: A Quarter For The Ladies Room 
 1973: Tricks
 1976: Best Friend
 1977: The Ice Show
 1980: Changes 
 1989: Jerome Robbins' Broadway ("High Button Shoes" segment)

References

External links

 
 

1914 births
2000 deaths
American costume designers
Drama Desk Award winners
Tony Award winners